Fromage fort (literally "strong cheese") is a French cheese spread traditionally made by blending together pieces of different leftover cheeses, white wine (or other spirits), garlic, and various herbs. Other ingredients include pepper and leek broth.  Aging is optional.

Blue cheese, while one of the possible components, is usually included in small quantities, as its flavor is often stronger than other traditional ingredients.

Cheeses used in fromage fort include:
 Camembert
 Brie
 Swiss cheese
 Parmigiano-Reggiano
 Goat milk cheese

Similar products
Obatzda, from Germany is produced by blending cheeses, flavourings, butter, and beer.

See also
 List of spreads

References 

French cuisine
Cheese dishes
Spreads (food)